Robert Brooke may refer to:

Military
 Robert Greville, 2nd Baron Brooke (1607–1643), English Civil War Parliamentarian general
 Robert Brooke-Popham (1878–1953), British Royal Air Force officer, born Robert Brooke

Politics
 Robert Brooke (MP for Dunwich) (1572–1646), English politician
 Robert Brooke (16th century MP) (1531–1599), MP for City of York
 Robert Brooke Sr. (1602–1655), British Governor of Maryland
 Robert Brooke (died 1669) (1637–1669), British Member of Parliament for Aldeburgh
 Robert Brooke (East India Company officer) (1744–1811), British Governor of St. Helena
 Robert Brooke (Virginia governor) (1760–1800), Governor of Virginia, 1794–1796

Other
 Bob Brooke (born 1960), American retired ice hockey player
 Robert Brooke (cricket writer) (born 1940), English cricket writer

See also
Robert Brooks (disambiguation)